Young Gardeners is an oil painting by Malle Leis in the Tartu Art Museum.

The painting shows a double self-portrait against a background of flowers and could be interpreted to mean two young gardeners lying down in a field of flowers of their own cultivation, as the title suggests. Its geometric forms with pop elements was probably originally intended to be a pendant of a similar work featuring a double portrait of her husband, painted in the same year.

References 

Young Gardeners in Europeana website

1968 paintings
Collection of Tartu Art Museum
Estonian paintings
Pop art